José Ignacio "Nacho" Martín Monzón (born 22 April 1983) is a Spanish professional basketball player for Njarðvík of the Úrvalsdeild karla. He is a 6 ft. 8.75 in. (2.05 m) tall power forward-center. His nickname is DaFlow. His father, Morti Martín, was also a professional basketball player.

Professional career
In his pro career, Martín has played with the following clubs: FC Barcelona, Círculo Badajoz, Calpe, Gipuzkoa Basket, Granada, Zaragoza, Valladolid, and Gran Canaria. He signed with Gran Canaria in 2013.

Martín came back to his native city in January 2018, for playing with LEB Oro team Carramimbre CBC Valladolid, but just after only one game, on 13 January 2018 he agrees terms with ICL Manresa for playing until the end of the 2017–18 season.

On August 13, 2018, Martín signed a one-year deal with Tecnyconta Zaragoza of the Liga ACB. On July 31, 2019, Martín signed a one-year deal with Coosur Real Betis.

After starting the season with CB Cornella, Martín signed with Njarðvík of the Icelandic Úrvalsdeild karla in November 2022.

Spain national team
With the junior national team of Spain, Martín won the silver medal at the 2002 FIBA Europe Under-20 Championship. He has played several friendly games with the senior Spain men's national basketball team. Martin has also played with National 3x3 team winning the silver medal at the 2015 European Games

References

External links
Twitter Account
Euroleague.net Profile
FIBA Profile
FIBA Europe Profile
Eurobasket.com Profile
Spanish League Profile 
Draftexpress.com Profile

1983 births
Living people
Basket Zaragoza players
Basketball players at the 2015 European Games
BC Andorra players
Spanish expatriate basketball people in Andorra
Spanish expatriate basketball people in Iceland
European Games medalists in basketball
European Games silver medalists for Spain
CB Estudiantes players
CB Gran Canaria players
CB Granada players
CB Valladolid players
Centers (basketball)
FC Barcelona Bàsquet players
FC Barcelona Bàsquet B players
Gipuzkoa Basket players
Liga ACB players
Njarðvík men's basketball players
Power forwards (basketball)
Real Betis Baloncesto players
Spanish men's basketball players
Spanish men's 3x3 basketball players
Úrvalsdeild karla (basketball) players